Dayavan is a 1988 Indian Hindi-language action crime film directed by Feroz Khan. It is a remake of the 1987 Tamil film Nayakan. The film stars Vinod Khanna, Feroz Khan and Madhuri Dixit with Aditya Pancholi in important roles. 

The film was a box office hit and received critical acclaim. 

The film was most talked about for its passionate lovemaking scene between Khanna and Dixit but there was more to the film than the kiss. Khanna played the titular role and avenges the death of his father. The film is remembered for its powerful performance, which is considered to be one of his best. It also marked the Hindi film debut and subsequent foray for Telugu film female stars, Amala Akkineni & Ramya Krishnan.

Plot
After having witnessed his dad being killed by the local police, and being orphaned and homeless, Shakti Velu develops hatred and distrust of the police in India. He is befriended by another homeless boy named Shanker, who asks him to accompany him to Bombay's slums, where they live with a kind-hearted Muslim named Karim Baba, and his daughter, Shama. This is where Shakti and Shankar spend their childhood. When they mature, they take to petty crime. Here too, Shakti witnesses police brutality and atrocities, especially at the hands of sadistic, alcoholic, and womanizing Police Inspector Ratan Singh. When Karim Baba is arrested, jailed, and found hanging by his neck in police custody, Shakti hunts down Ratan Singh, and kills him in broad daylight in front of several hundred people. An investigation is launched, but no one comes forward as a witness. Thus Shakti gets his reputation as a Don with a good heart i.e., Dayavan. Shakti marries a local prostitute, Neelu, and has two children, Suraj and Sarita. He becomes even more powerful and influential all over Bombay, and his working partners are powerful criminal dons who have ruled over Bombay for eons. Shakti eventually replaces these dons and becomes Bombay's only Don. This creates enemies for him and his family, but he believes since he has not really done any harm to anyone, he and his family will be safe. It is this belief that will take a heavy toll on his life and that of his family when the truth dawns that he, himself, is responsible for being kind to a man, who will ultimately bring forward ruin to the Velu family.

Cast
 Vinod Khanna as Shakti Velu aka Dayavan
 Feroz Khan as Shanker Waghmare
 Madhuri Dixit as Neelu, wife of Shakti
 Aditya Pancholi as Dayavan's son-in-Law
 Amrish Puri as Inspector Ratan Singh
 Aanjjan Srivastav as Superintendent of Police
 Amala Akkineni as Sarita
 Anuradha Patel as Shama
 Aruna Irani as Tara
 Tinnu Anand as Ajit Singh Ratan Singh's son
 Alok Nath as Karim Baba
 Naresh Suri as Tora Swami
 Ramesh Tiwari as Anna
 Sudhir Pandey as Manjle Anna
 Mangal Dhillon as Chhote Anna
 Mahaveer Shah as Choksi Bhai
 Ramya Krishnan in an item number

Soundtrack
The soundtrack is available on T-Series, and is composed by veteran music directors Laxmikant–Pyarelal. The hit song "Aaj Phir Tum Pe" was recreated in 2014 for the film Hate Story 2, with vocals rendered by Arijit Singh. Chahe Meri Jaan Tu Le Le was recreated in 2019 for Marjaavaan with vocals rendered by Tulsi Kumar and Jubin Nautiyal

Box office 
The film was declared a ‘super hit’ and the film was critically acclaimed for its story, soundtrack and the portrayal of the leading actor Vinod Khanna. As the titular hero, he avenges the death of his father. The film is considered as one of his best performances. The performance of lead actress Madhuri Dixit and Feroz Khan were also praised.

References

External links
 

1980s Hindi-language films
1988 films
Films scored by Laxmikant–Pyarelal
Hindi remakes of Tamil films
Films about organised crime in India
Films set in Mumbai
Films directed by Feroz Khan
Indian gangster films